The coat of arms of Bermuda depicts a red lion holding a shield that has a depiction of a wrecked ship upon it.  The red lion is a symbol of Great Britain and alludes to Bermuda's relationship with that country.  The Latin motto under the coat of arms, Quo Fata Ferunt, means "Whither the Fates Carry [Us]". The wrecked ship is the Sea Venture. The arms were formally granted by Royal Warrant on 4 October 1910, but had been in use since at least 1624. The coat of arms first appears on the cover of the 1624 edition of The Generall Historie of Virginia, New-England, and the Summer Isles. The "Somers Isles" is another name for Bermuda, named after Sir George Somers, the colony's founder.

Blazon 
The heraldic blazon is: Argent, on a mount vert a lion sejant affronté gules supporting between the fore-paws an antique shield azure thereon a representation of the wreck of the ship Sea Venture proper.

Sea Venture

Main article: Sea Venture

On 10 April 1591, three ships sailed from Plymouth, England for the East Indies. They were the Penelope, the Merchant Royal, and the Sea Venture.  On 2 June 1609, Sea Venture set sail from Plymouth as the flagship of a seven-ship fleet (towing two additional pinnaces) destined for Jamestown, Virginia as part of the Third Supply, carrying 500 to 600 people (it is unclear whether that number includes crew, or only settlers). On 24 July, the fleet ran into a strong storm, likely a hurricane, and the ships were separated. A pinnace, Catch, went down with all aboard lost. Sea Venture however, fought the storm for three days. Comparably sized ships had survived such weather, but Sea Venture had a critical flaw in her newness: her timbers had not set. The caulking was forced from between them, and the ship began to leak rapidly. All hands were applied to bailing, but water continued to rise in the hold.

The ship's starboard-side guns were reportedly jettisoned to raise her buoyancy, but this only delayed the inevitable. The Admiral of the Company himself, Sir George Somers, was at the helm through the storm. When he spied land on the morning of 25 July, the water in the hold had risen to 9 feet (2.7 m), and crew and passengers had been driven past the point of exhaustion. Somers deliberately had the ship driven onto the reefs of Discovery Bay, in what later proved to be eastern Bermuda, in order to prevent its foundering. This allowed 150 people, and one dog, to be landed safely ashore. The survivors, including several company officials (Lieutenant-General Sir Thomas Gates, the ship's captain Christopher Newport, Sylvester Jordain, Stephen Hopkins, later of Mayflower, and secretary William Strachey), were stranded on Bermuda for approximately nine months.  The crew cut down Bermuda cedar trees and built a seaworthy craft of eighteen tons. They caulked her seams with lime salvaged from the ship and oil extracted from local turtles they caught for food. They ate turtle meat fish, birds - and wild hogs.

Flag of Bermuda 
On 4 October 1910, the coat of arms (without the banner holding the motto) was added to the Red ensign to create the current Flag of Bermuda. The coat of arms replaced a badge which had been in use on the Bermuda red ensign before October 1910. The badge was based on a sketch, made in 1869, of the 1817 seal, which depicted a wet dock of the time showing with some boats in the background. It is assumed that the scene alludes to the fact that the islands were a stopover base for the sailing ships when the badge was approved by the Admiralty.

See also
 Flag of Bermuda 
 List of coats of arms of the United Kingdom and dependencies

References

External links
Coat of arms of Bermuda In The World All Countries Coat of arms

Bermuda
Bermuda
Bermudian culture
Bermuda
Bermuda